Jon Anderson is an American football coach and former player. He served as the head football coach at the University of Sioux Falls from 2017 to 2022. Anderson served as the head football coach at West Virginia State University from 2013 to 2016.

Head coaching record

References

External links
 Sioux Falls profile

Year of birth missing (living people)
Living people
Buena Vista Beavers football coaches
Buena Vista Beavers football players
Dakota State Trojans football coaches
Sioux Falls Cougars football coaches
West Virginia State Yellow Jackets football coaches
South Dakota State University alumni